Briana Banks (born Briana Bany; 21 May 1978) is a German-American pornographic actress and model. She was the Penthouse Pet of the Month for June 2001.

Early life
Banks was born in Munich, Germany to a German father and an American mother. They moved to Britain when she was four, then to the Los Angeles suburb of Simi Valley when she was seven. Her father still lives in Germany. Banks moved out of her mother's house when she was 16, taking her 14-year-old sister with her. She got custody of her sister when she turned 18.

Personal life
Banks was engaged to fellow adult film star Bobby Vitale between 2003 and 2006.

Career

Banks modeled as a teenager, appearing on a cover of Teen magazine. She entered the industry under the name "Mirage", but began calling herself "Briana Banks" in 1999, after having the first of two breast enlargement operations. Having had aspirations of being a supermodel, she chose the professional surname "Banks" after model Tyra Banks. Her first appearance using the new name was in the film Decadent Whores 9.

In June 2001, Banks was Penthouse magazine's Pet of the Month.

On October 13, 2006, Banks reportedly filed a federal lawsuit seeking more than US$75,000 in damages against Doc Johnson Enterprises, charging that they had created unauthorized products from molds of her genitals.

Starting in 2006, Banks went on hiatus from performing in videos and returned in 2008. That same year she was also nominated for five AVN Awards at the 25th annual Adult Entertainment Expo in Las Vegas.

In 2011, Banks starred in the porn parody version of the Fox animated series American Dad!, American Dad XXX: An Exquisite Films Parody. Banks portrayed the character of Francine Smith and was featured on the video's box cover. The video was released in September 2011.

On December 28, 2015 Briana Banks announced that she was making a comeback in 2016 after a 5-year hiatus. The same year she was inducted into the XRCO Hall of Fame.

Appearances
Banks was featured in the thirteen episode cable television series Vivid Valley produced by World of Wonder that was broadcast in Europe in 2005 and later had a successful run on Playboy TV. The series featured stories about the real lives of then Vivid Girls Jenna Jameson, Savanna Samson, Mercedez, Tawny Roberts, Banks, and others.

Other ventures
In 2002 Banks was one of the first porn actresses to have an action figure made in her likeness, by Los Angeles-based Cyber F/X and Sota Toys.

Awards and nominations

References

External links

 
 
 
 2009 podcast interview

1978 births
American pornographic film actresses
German emigrants to the United States
Living people
Penthouse Pets
People from Simi Valley, California
Pornographic film actors from California
21st-century American women